William Spence (1926-1993) was an English footballer. He was a defender who played for Queens Park Rangers and Portsmouth F.C.

1926 births
1993 deaths
English footballers
Association football defenders
Queens Park Rangers F.C. players
Portsmouth F.C. players